The Nigeria national under-16 and under-17 basketball team is a national basketball team of Nigeria, governed by the Nigeria Basketball Federation.
It represents the country in international under-16 and under-17 (under age 16 and under age 17) basketball competitions.

See also
Nigeria national basketball team
Nigeria national under-19 basketball team
Nigeria women's national under-17 basketball team

References

External links
Archived records of Nigeria team participations

Basketball teams in Nigeria
Men's national under-17 basketball teams
Basketball